Vicente Flores was Apu Mallku of Qullana Suyu Marka (Greater Collasuyu) between 2003 and 2004. He was replaced by Antonio Machaca.

See also
Politics of Peru

References

Apu Mallku
Indigenous leaders of the Americas
Living people
Year of birth missing (living people)
Peruvian politicians